Bánh canh are a thick Vietnamese noodles that can be made from tapioca flour or a mixture of rice and tapioca flour. "Cake" refers to the thick sheet of uncooked dough from which the noodles are cut.

Bánh canh cua – a rich, thick crab soup, often with the addition of quail eggs.
Bánh canh bột lọc – a more translucent and chewy version of the noodle.
Bánh canh chả cá – the dish includes fish cake and is popular in South Central Vietnam.
Bánh canh giò heo tôm thịt – includes pork knuckle and shrimp.
Bánh canh Trảng Bàng – bánh canh made in the southeastern Vietnamese town of Trảng Bàng, served with boiled pork, tapioca noodles, and local herbs.
Bánh canh tôm – a shrimp-flavoured broth that is also mixed with coconut milk.

The Vietnamese word bánh refers to items such as noodles or cakes that are made from flour, and canh means "soup."

See also

Udon, Japanese noodles
Cu mian, Chinese thick noodles
Shahe fen
Rice noodles
Lai fun

References

External links

 Trảng Bàng's famous boiled pork
 Crab Banh canh cua
Alice's Guide to Vietnamese Banh

Vietnamese soups
Vietnamese words and phrases
Noodle soups
Vietnamese noodle dishes
Vietnamese seafood dishes
Rice flour dishes
Bánh